This list of churches in Brønderslev Municipality lists church buildings in Brønderslev Municipality, Denmark.

List

Church of Denmark 
These churches are part of the Church of Denmark:

Independent churches

References 

Churches
Brønderslev